Sanderson Lam (born 28 January 1994) is an English professional snooker player.

Early life
Lam was born to Chinese parents in Leeds, England. His parents moved to England in the 1980s.

Career
In 2011 Lam started to take part in the Players Tour Championship, a tournament series for professionals and amateurs. In the first three tournaments in England, he lost the first match in each case, but at the Paul Hunter Classic in Fürth he secured two victories in the qualifying rounds and played Mark Williams where he was defeated 4–0. Over the next year, he participated in a further four tournaments. Following the end of the season he entered Q School where he reached the semifinals of his group before losing to Elliot Slessor who went on to secure qualification for the main tour
In the 2014–15 season he was able to improve in the PTC tournaments and succeeded in qualifying for the EBSA Qualifying Tour play-offs. There he was able to prevail among the 16 participants, and win one of the two main tour places after defeating TJ Dowling 4–2 in the final round. As a result, Lam was given a two-year card on the professional World Snooker Tour for the 2015–16 and 2016–17 seasons.
Lam defeated David Morris 6–3 to qualify for the 2015 International Championship. On his venue stage ranking event debut he thrashed Michael Wild 6–0, but then failed to pick up a frame himself in the second round against Zhou Yuelong.
Lam lost all eight matches he played after this.
Wins over Wang Yuchen and Alan McManus with the loss of a single frame helped Lam progress to the third round of the Northern Ireland Open, where he was ousted 4–1 by Hossein Vafaei. At the Gibraltar Open he eliminated Wang 4–3, Noppon Saengkham and Peter Ebdon both 4–1 to reach the last 16 of a ranking event for the first time and he would be on the wrong end of a 4–1 scoreline against Judd Trump. Lam squeezed past Mark King 5–4 at the China Open, before losing 5–2 to Kyren Wilson in the second round and he needed to have a successful Q School campaign in order to avoid being relegated from the tour. A 4–2 victory over Joe Swail in the final round of the second event earned him a new two-year tour card.

Performance and rankings timeline

Personal life
While Lam speaks English as his first language, he can also speak Chinese languages, though not fluently. He remarked "I was born over here but as soon as they see I am Chinese, they think I can speak fluently. It’s a shock." "I can speak Chinese, but not fluently. I am still trying to learn a lot. I have got quite a strong Leeds accent, a deep voice, so when I talk in China, they can’t understand the accent." Although his parents speak English, Mandarin and Cantonese, he mainly speaks English.

Career finals

Team finals: 1 (1 title)

References

External links

Sanderson Lam at worldsnooker.com
Sanderson Lam at CueTracker.net: Snooker Results and Statistic Database

1994 births
Living people
English people of Chinese descent
Snooker players from Leeds